Penryn was a parliamentary borough in Cornwall, which elected two Members of Parliament (MPs) to the House of Commons of England from 1553 until 1707, to the House of Commons of Great Britain from 1707 to 1800, and finally to the House of Commons of the United Kingdom from 1801 to 1832. Elections were held using the bloc vote system.

The Reform Act 1832 abolished the parliamentary borough of Penryn. The town of Penryn was combined with neighbouring Falmouth to form the new parliamentary borough of Penryn and Falmouth.

History

Franchise
The borough consisted of the town of Penryn, a market town in the west of Cornwall, two miles from the Killigrew seat of Arwenack House (which in the 17th century became the nucleus of the town of Falmouth). In the 16th century the Killigrew family owned the fee farm of Penryn borough, and thus had a strong influence in the borough of Penryn. The right to vote was exercised by all inhabitants paying scot and lot, which in prosperous Penryn made for a big enough electorate to ensure competitive elections; in the 18th century the number with the right to vote varied between 130 and 200, and by 1831 over 500 were qualified.

Nevertheless, Penryn recognised "patrons", important local landowners who were allowed influence in the choice of MPs. In the mid 18th century, the patrons were Lord Edgcumbe and Viscount Falmouth, both prominent "election managers" for the Whig government; but Edgcumbe's influence was much more secure than Falmouth's. Sir Lewis Namier, in his ground-breaking study of the elections of the 1750s and 1760s, took Penryn as one of his case studies. He quotes a contemporary source that Penryn prided itself "upon having had representatives of name and note", and the patrons' continued influence seems to have rested partly on their finding candidates for Penryn who fitted the voters' feeling of self-worth.

The election of 1761
In 1761, another influential local figure, Francis Basset, challenged the Edgcumbe and Falmouth domination. Edgcumbe had proposed the famous Admiral, George Rodney, while Falmouth's candidate was the less well-known Sir Edward Turner. Basset put up two candidates of his own, Edmund Maskelyne and George Clive, a London banker and cousin of the famous general "Clive of India", and there followed a vigorously contested and expensive election. Clive had paid his own expenses in the contest, but four years later still owed his cousin 2,000 guineas which had lent him for the purpose, which gives some idea of the scale of expenditure involved.

The politics of the period was complicated by the accession of King George III the previous year, which had disrupted many of the established party and factional alignments. A forged letter was apparently circulated in Penryn, seeming to show that Prime Minister Newcastle supported the Basset candidates, and this swayed a number of votes among Customs officers, who depended on government favour for their livelihood.

The Falmouth and Edgcumbe candidates won, receiving 68 votes each compared to 63 for Clive and 61 for Maskelyne, but from this point onwards the Falmouth influence was broken and in future elections it was Basset who found himself with the power of nomination in Penryn.

After the 1760s
Later in the century the patronage came to be shared between Basset and the Duke of Leeds, though in the last years before Reform Basset's son (who became Lord de Dunstanville) was allowed to exercise patronage alone on the understanding that he did not interfere in the Duke's other Cornish borough, Helston. Elections were generally contested, and the outcome was often a sharing of the representation with one Whig and one Tory returned. In this final period, elections in Penryn became notoriously corrupt, although as Namier suggests the notoriety may have arisen chiefly from the fact the bribery now involved private citizens on both sides instead of the government being complicit in it. In 1828, two years before the first attempt to pass a general Reform Act, the Whigs picked Penryn as a suitable case for an attempt at more limited reform after an election where voters were reportedly treated to a "breakfast" worth 24 guineas a head; they proposed a bill in the House of Commons to disfranchise Penryn and transfer its two seats to Manchester. First an act was rushed through Parliament to indemnify witnesses to the alleged corruption giving evidence on the disfranchising bill; which latter bill was, however, defeated because there was at this point a Tory majority opposed to Reform.

Unlike most of the Cornish rotten boroughs before 1832, Penryn was a town of reasonable size: in 1831, the population of the borough was 3,251, and contained 654 houses, which would have been big enough for Penryn to retain one of its two MPs under the Reform Act. However, neighbouring Falmouth was a much larger town and had no borough representation; the decision was therefore taken to extend the borough's boundaries to take in Falmouth, as well as parts of Budock and St Gluvias, which raised the population to 11,881. This newly delineated borough, which elected two MPs, was renamed Penryn and Falmouth.

Members of Parliament

MPs 1553–1629

MPs 1640–1832

Notes

References

 D Brunton & D H Pennington, Members of the Long Parliament (London: George Allen & Unwin, 1954)
 John Cannon, Parliamentary Reform 1640-1832 (Cambridge University Press, 1972)
 William Cobbett, Cobbett's Parliamentary history of England, from the Norman Conquest in 1066 to the year 1803 (London: Thomas Hansard, 1808)
 Maija Jansson (ed.), Proceedings in Parliament, 1614 (House of Commons) (Philadelphia: American Philosophical Society, 1988)
 J E Neale, The Elizabethan House of Commons (London: Jonathan Cape, 1949)
 J Holladay Philbin, Parliamentary Representation 1832 - England and Wales (New Haven: Yale University Press, 1965)
 Edward Porritt and Annie G Porritt, The Unreformed House of Commons (Cambridge University Press, 1903)
 

Parliamentary constituencies in Cornwall (historic)
Constituencies of the Parliament of the United Kingdom established in 1553
Constituencies of the Parliament of the United Kingdom disestablished in 1832
Rotten boroughs
Penryn, Cornwall